Netty is a given name or nickname that has Hebrew, Latin and English derivations.  It is a variant, version or derivative of many names including Anne (Hebrew),  Hannah (English), Antoinette (French, Latin), Antonia (Latin), and Nanette (French, Hebrew), and Nettie (English).

Given name
Netty Herawaty  (1930–1989), Indonesian actress
Netty Kim (born 1976), Canadian figure skater
Netty Pinna (1883–1937), Estonian actress
Netty Probst (1903–1990), Luxembourgian lawyer
Netty Simons (1913–1994) American musician
Netty van Hoorn (born 1951), Dutch film director and producer

Nickname
nickname of Anna Seghers  pseudonym of Anna Reiling (1900 – 1983), German writer
nickname of Antoinette Hendrika Nijhoff-Wind (1897 - 1971), Dutch writer 
nickname of Carlina Renae White also known as Nejdra Nance (born 1987), American kidnapping victim

See also

 Natty (disambiguation)
Netta (name)
Netti (name)
Netto
 Netty (disambiguation)
 Nitty (disambiguation)

Notes

English feminine given names
French feminine given names
Hebrew feminine given names